Harry and the Hendersons is a 1987 American fantasy comedy film directed and produced by William Dear and starring John Lithgow, Melinda Dillon, Don Ameche, David Suchet, Margaret Langrick, Joshua Rudoy, Lainie Kazan, and Kevin Peter Hall. Steven Spielberg served as its uncredited executive producer, while Rick Baker provided the makeup and the creature designs for Harry. The film tells the story of a Seattle family's encounter with the cryptozoological creature Bigfoot, partially inspired by the numerous claims of sightings in the Pacific Northwest, California, and other parts of both the United States and Canada over three centuries. In conjunction with the film's setting, shooting took place at several locations in the Cascade Range of Washington state near Interstate 90 and the town of Index near US 2, as well as Seattle's Wallingford, Ballard and Beacon Hill neighborhoods and other locations in or around Seattle.

Harry and the Hendersons grossed $50 million worldwide. It won an Oscar for Best Makeup at the 60th Academy Awards, and inspired a television spin-off of the same name. In the United Kingdom, the film was originally released as Bigfoot and the Hendersons, though the television series retained the American title. The DVD and all current showings of the film in the UK now refer to the film by its original title.

Plot
Following a camping trip in the nearby Cascade mountains, George Henderson drives home to suburban Seattle with his family when he hits a Bigfoot with his station wagon. Believing it to be dead and the key to fame and fortune, the family straps the creature to the roof of their car. A lone hunter tracking the creature discovers the Hendersons' damaged license plate.

That night, George goes to the garage to examine the Bigfoot and discovers it was alive and has escaped. He finds the creature in the kitchen, having knocked over the refrigerator while looking for food. The family soon realizes that the creature is intelligent and friendly. The family bonds with the creature and George decides to return him to the wilderness. Naming the Bigfoot "Harry", George tries to lure him into the station wagon with food, but Harry becomes upset and runs off.

Saddened, the family attempt to resume their normal lives, but sightings of Harry become more frequent as media fervor heightens. George tries to find Harry and visits the "North American Museum of Anthropology" to speak with Dr. Wallace Wrightwood, a supposed expert on Bigfoot. Giving his phone number to the museum clerk, George resumes his search. The legendary hunter-turned-Bigfoot-tracker, Jacques LaFleur, finds the Henderson household. At work, George's father asks him to make a poster of a vicious Bigfoot to drum up gun sales, but George throws the sketch away, replacing it with a proper depiction of the peaceful Harry. His father in turn alters it to make him look threatening, resulting in George quitting his job. George soon follows a Bigfoot sighting into the city while the terrified and confused Harry continues to evade hunters and the police as he attempts to find safety. George saves Harry from LaFleur, who is arrested. George brings Harry home and he is reunited with the Henderson family.

George invites Dr. Wrightwood to dinner, revealed to have been the museum clerk. He urges the Hendersons to give up on Bigfoot as it has destroyed his life. He then meets Harry, restoring his enthusiasm. Bailed out of jail, LaFleur travels to the Henderson house to kill Harry. Harry and the Hendersons escape with Dr. Wrightwood in his truck, and LaFleur gives chase. Fleeing back to the mountains, George tries to force Harry to leave. Confused and upset, Harry departs but the family realizes that LaFleur can track Harry's footprints in the snow. Despite their efforts to misdirect him, LaFleur tracks Harry and attempts to shoot him with a rifle. Harry subdues LaFleur and George intervenes when LaFleur attempts to escape, but Harry stops George from assaulting LaFleur. Through Harry's kindness, LaFleur gives up the hunt when he realizes that Harry is more than a simple beast.

As the family says goodbye, George thanks Harry and the two embrace. George tells him to take care of himself, to which Harry replies, "Okay" – revealing he has the ability to learn language. As Harry leaves, three other hiding Bigfoots and one adolescent suddenly emerge and then quickly disappear into the wilderness with Harry as the Henderson family watches in amazement.

Cast

Music
Bruce Broughton composed the film's original score, and co-wrote "Love Lives On" with Barry Mann (music), Cynthia Weil (lyrics) and Will Jennings (lyrics), performed by Joe Cocker over the end credits (in place of Broughton's planned end title cue); the soundtrack version of "Love Lives On" has a saxophone solo on a single and was later released as a single. MCA Records released a soundtrack album on record and cassette; in 2007, Intrada Records issued an expanded album, marking the music's premiere CD release, with the exceptions of the original album version of "Love Lives On" and "Your Feet's Too Big".

1987 MCA soundtrack album

2007 Intrada album
The album begins with the film version of "Love Lives On", which has a flute solo, rather than the guitar heard on the single and on the 1987 soundtrack album.

Personnel on "Love Lives On"
 Joe Cocker – vocals 
 Robbie Kilgore – keyboards
 Dan Hartman – additional keyboards
 Phil Grande – all guitars
 Kevin Totoian – bass
 David Beal – drums
 Michael Brecker – tenor saxophone solo
 Lawrence Feldman – tenor saxophone intro and ending

Reception

Box office
Harry and the Hendersons opened third behind Beverly Hills Cop II and The Untouchables. It went on to gross $29.8 million at the North American box office and $20.2 million internationally for a total of $50 million worldwide.

Critical response
Michael Wilmington of the Los Angeles Times commended Lithgow's performance and the film's "technical triumphs", the latter of which he noted "seem to overpower its weak, juiceless [...] gags". Dave Kehr, writing for The Chicago Tribune, wrote that the film "takes a leisurely spin through the standard Spielberg themes, without gathering the visual grandeur or emotional extravagance that are Spielberg's trademarks". Both Wilmington and Kehr noted an influence of Spielberg on director William Dear, with Wilmington calling Dear "a film maker immersing himself so thoroughly in the sensibility of another that he disappears--like a drowning man sinking slowly beneath waves of chocolate"; Kehr wrote that "[Dear's] personality seems wholly subsumed by Spielberg's."

Gene Siskel and Roger Ebert reviewed the film negatively, with Siskel calling it "a very manipulative movie that anyone who's seen E.T. has seen before", and Ebert stating that "What it lacks is any sense of awe about the fact there could be a Bigfoot, an unknown creature living in the woods with a mind of its own, [...] Harry is so cute, so gentle, so lovable that there is no sense of mystery and no sense of awe. There's no belief that he's really Bigfoot."

In 2007, Slant Magazines Eric Henderson gave the film a score of two out of four stars, writing that "Just as Mac and Me eventually devolved into a feature-length commercial for McDonald's, Harry and the Hendersons eventually emerges as a vegetarian screed."

On Rotten Tomatoes, the film has an approval rating of 45% based on reviews from 22 critics, with an average rating of 5.2/10.

Awards

Home media
The film was released in December 1987 on LaserDisc, and was also released on VHS. It was later released on DVD in January 2011. A single-disc Blu-ray of the film was released on March 4, 2014.

Television spin-off
The film had a television series spin-off, also called Harry and the Hendersons. Kevin Peter Hall reprised Harry until his death in 1991. After that, Harry was performed by Dawan Scott in 1991-1992 and by Brian Steele in 1992–1993. Harry's vocal effects were provided by Patrick Pinney.
Leon Redbone's version of "Your Feet's Too Big" was used as its theme song.

References

External links

 
 
 
 

1980s buddy comedy films
1980s English-language films
1980s fantasy comedy films
1987 comedy films
1987 films
Amblin Entertainment films
American buddy comedy films
American fantasy comedy films
Bigfoot films
Fictional portrayals of the Seattle Police Department
Fictional quintets
Films about animal rights
Films about cryptids
Films adapted into television shows
Films based on urban legends
Films directed by William Dear
Films scored by Bruce Broughton
Films set in Seattle
Films set in Washington (state)
Films shot in Washington (state)
Films that won the Academy Award for Best Makeup
Films with screenplays by William Dear
Universal Pictures films
1980s American films